KLVV (88.7 FM, "The House Of Praise") is a radio station broadcasting a contemporary Christian music format. Licensed to Ponca City, Oklahoma, United States, the station is currently owned by The Love Station, Inc.

History
KGVV was on air on April 27, 2012. K297AZ was on air on November 9, 2009. KTST was on air on September 7, 2016 until 2021.

Translators
KLVV is also heard on KGVV 90.5 in Goltry, Oklahoma, as well as a translator on 107.3 in Stillwater, Oklahoma and 98.5 in Enid, Oklahoma. KLVV was also heard on KTST-HD2 in Oklahoma City, Oklahoma until 2021 when it switched to sister station KJTH.

References

External links

LVV
Contemporary Christian radio stations in the United States
Kay County, Oklahoma
Radio stations established in 1986
1986 establishments in Oklahoma